Ömnögovi (south gobi) may refer to:

 Ömnögovi Province, an aimag of Mongolia
 Ömnögovi, Uvs, a sum (district) in Uvs Aimag of Mongolia